Harriet Fraad (born August 19, 1941) is a feminist activist, psychotherapist and hypnotherapist in New York City. She has been practicing as a psychotherapist and hypnotherapist for 37 years. She is said to be a founding member of the Feminist movement, owed in part to her founding of the Women's Liberation Movement in 1968. She is the founder of the journal Rethinking Marxism and specializes in writing about the intersection between economics and psychology.

Personal life
Fraad was born to Lewis M. Fraad, a pediatrician, and Irma London, who both had leftist sympathies.  She is the wife of Marxian economist and intellectual Richard D. Wolff. Wolff and Fraad have two children together. She and Wolff co-write for Economy and Psychology, a blog on the interface of those two topics. She has two sisters, Julie Fraad and Rosalyn Baxandall.

Her father worked for the Comintern in Vienna from 1932 to 1936 and was a member of the Communist Party of America from 1929 to 1957. Her maternal grandfather was Horace London, the brother and campaign manager of Meyer London, later a U.S. Representative. To remain an activist her entire life Fraad would contribute to works and become a founding member in movements like the second-wave women's movement.  To keep updates on the Economics world she gives regular visits and talks on the Julianna Forlano Morning show on WBAI, MK Mendoza on KSFR, and Women's Spaces on WBBK. The latest work she contributed to was Knowledge, Class, and Economics: Marxism without Guarantees.

Fraad's uncle was Ephraim London, Irma's brother, and through him, her maternal cousin was Sheila Michaels, a remarkable feminist and activist in her own right, whom Ephraim never publicly acknowledged as his daughter.

In media

Books 
 Class Struggle on the Home Front, (w/Stephen Resnick & Richard Wolff), New York: Palgrave Macmillan, 2009
 Imagine Living in a Socialist USA: Imagine…Personal Emotional and Sexual Life Without Capitalism (w/Tess Fraad Wolff), (Edited F. Goldin, D. & S. Smith), New York: Harper Collins, Jan 2014.
 Bringing It All Back Home by Harriet Fraad, Richard Wolff, et al. | Apr 1, 1994 
 Rethinking Marxism (Vol 9 | No. 4 | 1996/97) by "At Home with Incest" by Harriet Fraad, " Juha Koivisto and Veikko Pietila on W. F. Haug and Projekt Ideologie-Theorie, Roby Rajan Henry A. Giroux on Paulo Freire, | Jan 1, 1996

Selected articles and publications 
 Gender and the Presidential Election, Coop Talk, Democracy at Work, Dec 2016
 Mass Killings: Why Americans Are “Going Postal" Truthout, Jan 2013
 Capitalism Works for me (or Not) for Me, (w/Richard Wolff), Truthout, Oct 2013
 The Feminist Movement: What Happened and Why, Tikkun Magazine, Feb 2013
 Capitalist Profit and Intimate Life, The Journal of Psychohistory, Jan 2013
 The Obama Election: Lessons for A Political Movement, Truthout, Nov 2012
 Living Alone: The Rise of Capitalism and the Decline of Families, Truthout, Oct 2012
 What's Wrong with America? 12 Steps Towards Change, Rethinking Marxism, Apr 2012 
 Village Abuse: It Takes a Village The Journal of Psychohistory, Jan 2012 
 Some Relationship Counseling for Feminism and the Left Truthout, Apr 2012 
 Profiting from Mental Ill Health The Guardian, Mar 2011 
 Capitalism and Loneliness: Why Pornography Is a Multibillion Dollar Industry (w/Tess Fraad Wolff), Truthout, Dec 2011 
 Where Is Home: A Revolution In Our Personal Lives Tikkun, Oct 2011 
 The Pursuit of Happiness Tikkun, Summer 2011 
 American Depression Tikkun, Jan/Feb Winter 2010 
 What's Really Behind The Catholic Church's Abuse Problem, Alternet, May 2010 
 Why Are American's Passive As Millions Lose Their Homes, Jobs, Families, & The American Dream?, Alternet, Feb 2010

Podcasts 
 Capitalism Hits Home with Dr. Harriet Fraad and Julianna Forlano
 It's Not Just In Your Head
 Regular guest on Economic Update with Richard D. Wolff
 Regular guest on The David Feldman Show
 Interpersonal Update (w/Tess Fraad Wolff), formerly broadcast on WBAI-FM, New York, Thursdays, 1-2PM EST

References

Living people
1941 births
American feminists
American Marxist writers
American people of Lithuanian-Jewish descent
American psychotherapists
Socialist feminists